Viivi Vainikka (born 23 December 2001) is a Finnish ice hockey player and member of the Finnish national team, currently playing in the Swedish Women's Hockey League (SDHL) with Luleå HF/MSSK.

Playing career  
Vainikka began playing hockey at the age of five. She made her debut in the Naisten Liiga, the top flight of Finnish women's hockey at the age of 15 with Team Kuortane. Across four years with the team, she scored 129 points in 112 games. After scoring a career-best 52 points in 30 games in the 2018–19 season, including 28 goals, she won the Emma Laaksonen Award for fair play.

She left Finland to sign a two-year contract with Luleå HF/MSSK in Sweden ahead of the 2020–21 SDHL season, joining the roster with the highest concentration of Finnish national team players in the world, Finland included. She scored twice in her first two SDHL games. In November 2020, along with four other Finnish national team and Luleå teammates, she was forced to miss several SDHL games while being quarantined under Finnish law after a national team camp where a player tested positive for COVID-19.

International  
Vainikka won silver with the Finnish national team at the 2019 Women's World Championship. She was officially named to the Finnish roster for the 2020 Women's World Championship on 4 March 2020, prior to the cancellation of the tournament International Ice Hockey Federation (IIHF) on 7 March 2020 due to public health concerns surrounding the COVID-19 pandemic.

Career statistics

Regular season and playoffs

International

Awards and honors

References

External links

2001 births
Living people
Finnish women's ice hockey forwards
Sportspeople from Espoo
Luleå HF/MSSK players
Team Kuortane players
Ice hockey players at the 2022 Winter Olympics
Olympic ice hockey players of Finland
Olympic bronze medalists for Finland
Olympic medalists in ice hockey
Medalists at the 2022 Winter Olympics